Clinton John Peake (born 25 March 1977 in Geelong, Victoria) is a former Australian first-class cricketer.

In his early career, Peake, a batsman, was selected as part of the Australian under-19s cricket team, which he captained in the 1994/95 season at 17 years of age. He scored 304 against Indian Youth in a match in Melbourne that season, the highest score in a U19 international match.

In the 1995/96 season, Peake made his first-class debut with the Victorian Bushrangers at just 18 years of age. He played six matches (and one List A match) but did not live up to the potential of his under-19s performances and was soon dropped. He did not play a Sheffield Shield match in 1996/97, with only one List A performance to his name.

Peake then spent three seasons in the wilderness before returning to the Bushrangers in the 1999/2000 season, still only 22 years of age. He played one first-class match that season, where he again failed, making scores of 1 and 4. He was retained for 2000/01, but again struggled, averaging 6.33 with the bat over three one-day matches, and 17.66 in four first-class innings.

These performances effectively ended his first-class career, and he headed back to his hometown of Geelong to play for the Geelong Cricket Club in Victorian Premier Cricket.

See also
 List of Victoria first-class cricketers

References

External links

CricketArchive profile

1977 births
Living people
Australian cricketers
Victoria cricketers
Cricketers from Geelong